Shota Rustaveli Tbilisi International Airport , formerly Novo Alexeyevka International Airport, is the busiest international airport in Georgia, located  southeast of capital Tbilisi. The airport handled 3.7 million passengers in 2019. Due to the global coronavirus pandemic, the airspace of Georgia was closed for most of 2020 causing the number of travelers through Tbilisi airport to drop by 84% to less than 600,000.

General
Tbilisi Airport is home to Georgian flag carrier Georgian Airways and MyWay Airlines, which was founded in 2017. The airport is served by approximately 30 airlines, mainly from Europe, the Middle East, and Central Asia serving roughly 30 destinations out of Tbilisi. Due to the increasing popularity of Georgia and the city of Tbilisi as a tourist destination, the number of travelers grew since 2010 from 1 million to almost 4 million until the outbreak of the coronavirus pandemic. The airspace of Georgia was closed for most of 2020 with the exception of government-mandated expatriation flights, but regular international air traffic resumed as of February 2021.

Following a political row in June 2019, Russia banned flights to and from Georgia starting July 8, 2019. Georgian Airways from Tbilisi to Moscow-Vnukovo have since been operated by Aircompany Armenia through Yerevan. The ban was still in effect at the end of 2021. The Kremlin has also banned all Russian airlines from flying to Georgia. A similar ban was in effect during 2006–2008.

The George W. Bush Avenue (Kakheti Highway) leads from the airport to the center of Tbilisi. A train service is available as well opposite the exit of the airport building. The train leaves twice a day from the modernist station that opened in 2007.

History
 The first airport terminal building was constructed in 1952. Designed by the architect V. Beridze in the style of Stalinist architecture the building featured a floor plan with symmetric axes and a monumental risalit in the form of a portico. The two wings featured blind arcades in giant order. A new terminal building was completed in 1990, designed in the International style.

In 1981 Tbilisi airport was the 12th largest airport in the Soviet Union, with 1,478,000 passengers on so-called central lines, which were flights connecting Tbilisi with cities in other Soviet republics. After the dissolution of the Soviet Union, the civil war and the economic crisis in the newly independent Georgia, passenger numbers had dropped to 230,000 by 1998.

Tbilisi International Airport is operated by TAV Urban Georgia since October 2005 which concession has been extended until at least 2037. In Georgia, the company also operates Batumi Airport for a 20-year term since May 2007. TAV Airports Holding, which owns 76% shares in Tbilisi airport operator TAV Urban Georgia, agreed with the Georgian state-owned United Airports of Georgia to reconstruct and extend the unused runway, one of the two runways at the Tbilisi airport, in line with ICAO standards to accept all type of aircraft, including the Boeing 747-8, Airbus A380-800, Antonov An-225 and Antonov An-124. A new F Code taxiway was also planned.

Modernisation
February 2007 saw the completion of a US$90.5 million reconstruction project, with the construction of a new international terminal, a car park, improvements to the apron, taxiway and runway and the acquisition of ground handling equipment and an annual passenger capacity of 2.8 million. A rail link to the city centre was constructed, with an infrequent rail service of two trains per day each way. The airport got a contemporary and functional design, to provide an optimized flow of both passengers and luggage from the parking lot to the planes, with a  total usable area, while future expansions can be implemented without interrupting terminal operations. Various food and beverage operations have been incorporated in the new terminal, including four duty-free stores. The implementing party for the project was TAV Urban Georgia, a concessionaire and special purpose vehicle for the construction and operation of the airport, and the project was financed by the International Finance Corporation (IFC) and European Bank for Reconstruction and Development (EBRD).

In 2016, the main runway of the airport was renovated and equipped with new navigation lighting. Runway guard lights, LED stop bar signals and guidance signs at all the holding positions on the airport's main runway were also added The instrument landing system was also upgraded to CAT II, which enables aircraft to land during poor weather conditions. The airfield lighting control and monitoring system was upgraded, including installation of new lighting signals on all four taxiways. The terminal's capacity was increased to 3.5 million passengers per year. In addition to the expansion of the terminal building, this $33 million project implemented, among other things, a new boarding bridge with two exits, five new aircraft parking spaces, three 150-meter luggage racks and a new parking lot for 250 cars.

A new Tbilisi metro overground line linking airport with the city was announced in October 2018. Proposed extension would connect the airport with Samgori metro station as transfer point with the existing metro line. Construction was set to begin in late 2019, but the project was effectively abandoned in spring 2021 when a feasibility study did not produce the desired outcome.

Airlines and destinations
Tbilisi airport mainly serves destinations in Europe and the Middle East. The Georgian government negotiates with several airlines to increase the number of destinations.

Flights to Russia have been suspended since July 8, 2019 due to sanctions imposed from Moscow. Georgian Airways flights from Tbilisi to Moscow-Vnukovo have since been operated by Aircompany Armenia via Yerevan. The Kremlin has also barred all Russian airlines from flying to Georgia.

Passenger

Cargo

Statistics

See also 
Georgian Civil Aviation Administration
List of the busiest airports in the former USSR
List of airports in Georgia
Transport in Georgia

References

External links

Airports built in the Soviet Union
Airports in Georgia (country)
Transport in Tbilisi
Airports established in 1952
1952 establishments in the Soviet Union